Oddvar Wenner Nilssen (22 October 1920 – 15 April 1979) was a Norwegian sports shooter. He competed in the 25 m pistol event at the 1952 Summer Olympics. He ranked 37th in the event.

References

1920 births
1979 deaths
Norwegian male sport shooters
Olympic shooters of Norway
Shooters at the 1952 Summer Olympics
Sportspeople from Oslo
20th-century Norwegian people